Leslie Williams may refer to:

 Leslie Williams (rugby) (1922–2006), Welsh rugby union, and rugby league footballer of the 1940s and 1950s
 The Leslie Williams Award for Best and Fairest Player, awarded at the Hong Kong Sevens
 Leslie Williams (Archdeacon of Chester) (born 1919), Archdeacon of Chester, 1975–1988
 Leslie Williams (Archdeacon of Bristol) (1909–1996), Archdeacon of Bristol, 1967–1979
 Leslie Williams (politician), Australian member of the New South Wales Legislative Assembly
 L. Pearce Williams (born 1927), professor of the history of science at Cornell University

See also
Les Williams (disambiguation)